Adam Charles Smyth (born 16 May 1981) is an English cricketer. Smyth is a right-handed batsman who bowls right-arm medium pace. He was born at Coventry, Warwickshire.

Smyth represented the Warwickshire Cricket Board in a single List A match against the Kent Cricket Board in the 2000 NatWest Trophy. In his only List A match, he scored 21 runs, while with the ball he took a single wicket at a cost of 32 runs.

He currently plays club cricket for Kenilworth Wardens Cricket Club in the Birmingham and District Premier League.

References

External links

1981 births
Living people
Cricketers from Coventry
English cricketers
Warwickshire Cricket Board cricketers